The 1775 English cricket season was the fourth in which matches have been awarded retrospective first-class cricket status. The scorecards of four first-class matches have survived.

Matches
Four first-class match scorecards survive from 1775.

14–15 June - Kent XI v Hampshire XI - Sevenoaks Vine
29–30 June - Hampshire XI v Kent XI - Broadhalfpenny Down
6–8 July - Surrey XI v Hampshire XI - Laleham Burway
13–17 July - Hampshire XI v Surrey XI - Broadhalfpenny Down

During the second Hampshire v Surrey match, John Small set a new record for the highest known score in cricket matches, making 136 for the Hampshire XI. This beat John Minshull's score of 107 set in 1769 and was the first century scored in a match that has been awarded first-class status. It lasted only until 1777 when James Aylward set a new mark with a score of 167.

Ten other matches are known to have been played during the season, including matches between county teams. Full scorecards do not survive from most of these matches.

Other events
During a single wicket cricket match in May at the Artillery Ground, Lumpy Stevens, bowling, beat John Small at least three times only for the ball to pass through centre of the wicket, which at that time still consisted of two stumps and a single bail crosspiece. This led to calls for the introduction of a third stump to make it impossible for the ball to pass through the centre of the wicket.

The earliest known reference to Oldfield Cricket Club in Berkshire and to cricket in Huntingdonshire date from 1774.

First mentions

Players
 Rev Charles Bartholomew (Surrey)
 William Edmeads (Surrey)
 Francis (Hampshire)
 Tom Taylor (Hampshire)

References

Bibliography

Further reading
 
 
 
 

1775 in English cricket
English cricket seasons in the 18th century